Nicholas John Childs (born 7 October 1961) is a Welsh musician, conductor, composer and brass educator.

Childs is known for his conducting of brass bands, winning numerous championships, his teaching at the university level, and his recordings of brass music. He is also the founder of two brass bands for children.

Life and career 
Childs was born on 7 October 1961 in Wales. He playing baritone horn at a young age with guidance from his father John. Childs first performed with the Tredegar Junior Band and later the National Youth Brass Band of Great Britain.

At age 16, Childs became the Welsh and British Euphonium Champion. In 1985, he was voted Euphonium Player of The Year.

Childs and his brother Bob toured internationally as the Childs Brothers. They debuted in Royal Albert Hall in 1984, His playing career included being Principal Euphonium at Grimethorpe Colliery Band and later the Foden's Band.  Later performance appointments included euphonium tutor at the Royal Northern College of Music, Salford University and Huddersfield University.

Currently, Childs is the conductor and music director for the award-winning, Black Dyke Band. Under his baton, the band has won three European Championships.

Childs is married to Alison Childs, an administrator and brass instrumentalist. Their daughter Rebecca is also a baritone instrumentalist.

Academic Awards

 Associate Royal College of Music (1995)
 Fellow of the London College of Music (1996)
 Master of Arts University of Salford (1995)
 Doctor of Musical Arts University of Salford (2002)
 Honorary doctorate from Leeds University (2006)
 Professor of music recording and performance at Leeds University (2009)
 Professor at the Senzoku Gakuen Tokyo, Japan (2014)
 Professor at the Royal Northern College of Music (2016)

Discography
To date Childs has conducted one hundred and sixty commercial CD recordings.  His works have received "CD of The Year" on multiple occasions by the British Bandsman, Brass Band World magazine and 4barsrest.

Championships
Childs has won the following championships:

 Three European Championships
 Six National Championships
 Three British Open Championships
 Six Scottish Open Championships
 Six Norwegian National Championships
 Nine Scottish Championships 
 Thirty-Four Regional Championships
 Four English Championships
 One French National Championships
 One Swedish National Championships
 Three Grand Shields
 One All-England International Championships
 One Brass in Concert Championships

Yorkshire Youth Brass Band
Childs was the Founder of the Yorkshire Youth Brass Band. The YYBB is administered by Alison Childs.

National Children's Brass Band of Great Britain
The National Children's Brass Band was the concept of Nicholas Childs, who is the music director since 2006. The band is for brass players from age 8 to 14.

References

External links
 IBBSS Profile Page

1961 births
Living people
British brass bands
British male conductors (music)
Welsh composers
Welsh male composers
Welsh conductors (music)
Brass band composers
Brass band conductors
Academics of the Royal Northern College of Music
Euphonium players
People from Saddleworth
People from Tredegar
People from Usk